Emmet  is a mountain in Landkreis Waldeck-Frankenberg, Hesse, Germany.

Mountains of Hesse